2018 Scottish Open may refer to: 

 2018 Scottish Open (badminton)
 2018 Scottish Open (snooker)
 2018 Scottish Open (darts)
 2018 Scottish Open (golf)
 2018 Scottish Open (speedway)